Sergei Sergeyevich Tsenin was a Soviet and Russian actor and director. Honored Artist of the RSFSR (1935).

Selected filmography 
 1930 — St. Jorgen's Day
1936 — Party Membership Card
1937 — Lenin in October
1939 — Squadron No. 5
 1945 — Fifteen-Year-Old Captain
 1946 — Cruiser 'Varyag'
1947 — Light over Russia
 1948 — Michurin
1949 — Encounter at the Elbe
1951 — Przhevalsky
1951 — Sporting Honour
1957 — A Lesson in History

References

External links 
 Сергей Ценин on kino-teatr.ru

1884 births
1964 deaths
20th-century Russian male actors
Honored Artists of the RSFSR
Recipients of the Order of the Red Banner of Labour
Russian male film actors

Russian male stage actors
Soviet male film actors
Soviet male stage actors